Old Bethany Church, also known as Old Bethany Church of Christ and Old Meetinghouse of the Bethany, is a historic Disciples of Christ church located at Main and Church Streets in Bethany, Brooke County, West Virginia. It was built in 1852, and is a two bay by five bay, brick meeting house-style building on a fieldstone and sandstone foundation. It is the second church building on this site and notable in the Disciples of Christ for its association with Alexander Campbell (1788–1866).

It was listed on the National Register of Historic Places in 1976.

References

External links

Christian Church (Disciples of Christ)
Churches on the National Register of Historic Places in West Virginia
Bethany College (West Virginia)
Churches in Brooke County, West Virginia
National Register of Historic Places in Brooke County, West Virginia
Historic American Buildings Survey in West Virginia
Churches completed in 1852
1852 establishments in Virginia